The 1929 Catholic University Cardinals football team was an American football team that represented the Catholic University of America as an independent during the 1929 college football season. In their fifth season under head coach John B. McAuliffe, the Cardinals compiled a 5–4 record.

Schedule

References

Catholic University
Catholic University Cardinals football seasons
Catholic University Cardinals football